Aspergillus amoenus is a species of fungus in the genus Aspergillus. It is from the Versicolores section. The species was first described in 1930.

References 

amoenus
Fungi described in 1930